Zaxby's is an American chain of fast casual restaurants offering chicken wings, chicken fingers, sandwiches, and salads. The chain operates primarily in the Southern United States and has more than 900 locations. Most Zaxby's restaurants are owned by franchisees, but 123 locations are owned by Zaxby company.

History and locations

Zaxby's chicken and Zax Sauce is based on another smaller chicken finger chain called Guthrie's that existed in Athens, Georgia, while Zach McLeroy attended the University of Georgia. The first Zaxby's was established in Statesboro, Georgia in March 1990, near the Georgia Southern University campus, by childhood friends Zach McLeroy and Tony Townley. The company's first restaurant outside of Georgia was opened in September 1994 in Bowling Green, Kentucky. In 2013, they opened locations in Utah, the first expansion outside of the southeastern United States.

As of 2023, Zaxby's has locations in 19 U.S. states. In December 2019, the Oklahoma-based Zaxby's franchisee announced it would be shuttering five of its nine locations across the state. Like other restaurants, since mid-March 2020, the COVID-19 pandemic caused Zaxby's dine-in lobbies to shut down indefinitely. Some locations had reopened by mid-May of 2020.

In 2022, Zaxby's introduced a new CEO, Bernard Acoca; he was the first CEO that was not one of the co-founders. Outgoing CEO Zach McLeroy stayed on as Chairman.

Menu and themes

The company operates as a fast casual dining restaurant, offering prepared-at-order chicken fingers, chicken wings, sandwiches, salads, and appetizers. Dipping sauces are offered with chicken finger orders, and range from mild, to the moderate "Zax sauce", to the intensely hot "Nuclear". Dining rooms at Zaxby's restaurants are decorated with assorted whimsical objects and signs, which often vary in theme by location and region. Some locations in college towns feature objects and decorations related to the local university.  Similarly, citrus-industry themed decorations line the walls at a location in Orlando, Florida.

Since the December 2013 announcement that Zaxby's would begin to offer the Coca-Cola Freestyle machine at their locations, the decor in the fountain drink dispensing area has been dominated by that distinctive dispenser and other Coca-Cola branding.

Advertising
In late 2007, the chain began running a series of commercials featuring celebrities eating Zaxby's menu items. The celebrities of 2007–2008 included Laverne and Shirley stars Penny Marshall and Cindy Williams, Bobby Allison, Diana DeGarmo, Herschel Walker, Evander Holyfield, Elijah Kelley, Lorenzo Lamas, Cody Linley, Jerry Rice, John Schneider, Alyson Stoner, Kerri Strug, Richard Thomas, Richard Karn, Reginald VelJohnson, David Garrard, and Spud Webb. In 2009, celebrities included Orange County Choppers Paul Teutul Sr. and Michael Teutul, Béla Károlyi, Fred Willard, Paul Sorvino, and Mike Ditka. 2010 and 2011 celebrities included Doris Roberts, E! News host Giuliana Rancic, Jaime Pressly, Ryan Stiles, and musician Little Richard. In 2012, the chain featured celebrities Rachel Dratch, Chris Kattan, Jill Hennessy, Lee Ann Womack, and National Football League linebacker Clay Matthews in its commercials. Zaxby's 2013 commercials featured David Alan Grier and Waylon Payne, with comedian Wayne Brady and actress Leigh-Allyn Baker.

In October 2008, the video game Midnight Club: Los Angeles featured Zaxby's as a restaurant on the streets of Los Angeles. California, however, has none in reality.

Sponsorships

Zaxby's is "The Official Chicken of Sports Fanz®" and has collective intellectual property rights at nearly 30 Division I colleges through 2015 through a deal with their football and basketball teams. The sponsorship, which was made through IMG College, includes 25 states, seven conferences, and the entire area of Zaxby's locations. Included are ten colleges from the Southeastern Conference, six colleges from the Atlantic Coast Conference, three colleges from Conference USA, two each from the Big Ten Conference and Sun Belt Conference, and one college from the Big 12 Conference. Additionally, Zaxby's has a separate agreement with Clemson University to provide brand presence at all football and men's and women's basketball games.

Zaxby's was also the sponsor of the Heart of Dallas Bowl, played at the Cotton Bowl Stadium.

Zaxby's was a sponsor for Joey Clanton in the No. 09 JTG Daugherty Racing truck in the NCWTS. Zaxby's also sponsored John Wes Townley (son of co-founder Tony) in NASCAR's Camping World Truck Series and Xfinity Series, and Townley's Athenian Motorsports. John Wes retired from competition after 2016, thus ending the sponsorship.

In honor of the children the restaurant chain serves every year, Zaxby's is a supporter of Make-A-Wish.

See also
 List of chicken restaurants

References

External links

 Zaxby's web site

Companies based in Athens, Georgia
Economy of the Southeastern United States
Regional restaurant chains in the United States
Fast-food chains of the United States
Fast casual restaurants
Fast-food poultry restaurants
Restaurants established in 1990
1990 establishments in Georgia (U.S. state)
Fast-food franchises
Chicken chains of the United States
Privately held companies based in Georgia (U.S. state)